Rurala Road railway station is located in the town of Rurala Road, Faisalabad District Pakistan.

See also
 List of railway stations in Pakistan
 Pakistan Railways

References

External links
Official Web Site of Pakistan Railways

Railway stations in Faisalabad District
Railway stations on Shorkot–Sheikhupura line